The Olympus μ-9000 (also known as the 'Stylus 9000') is the flagship model of Olympus' μ-Series line of point-and-shoot digital cameras. The μ Series consists of compact cameras characterized by small profiles, an optical zoom function, and a focus on stylish outward appearance.

Specifications

Gallery

See also
 Olympus Corporation
 List of Olympus products

External links
 Olympus Global Official Website
 Olympus America Homepage
 Olympus Imaging Singapore Homepage
 Olympus mju 9000 Review

References

 Olympus μ-9000 (Singapore)
 Olympus Stylus-9000 (America)

μ9000